Bishanpur is a village located in Pathna taluk, Sahibganj district, Jharkhand, India. This place is in the border of the Sahebganj District and Murshidabad District. It is near to the West Bengal state border.
Bishanpur is surrounded by Pathna Block towards west, Udhwa Block towards North, Farakka Block towards East, Barhait Block towards west. Pakaur, Dhulian, Paschim Punropara, Sahibganj are the nearby Cities to Bishanpur.

In olden times Bishanpur village was one of the biggest trading center of Barharwa. Now people go to Kendua for shopping, which is 1 km away. Every Saturday there will be Haat (small market) in Kendua. In Namste Road one post office is there. most of the people have their own small field for cultivation.

Languages 
Hindi, Santali and Angika are the local languages here.

Nearby places to visit 
 Bindabasini Temple

References

Villages in Sahibganj district